Line 13 of the Beijing Subway is a metro line that serves the northern suburbs of Beijing. On a map, Line 13's route is shaped like an inverted U that arcs north of the city and connects residential suburbs in Haidian, Changping and Chaoyang Districts with the 2nd Ring Road and Line 2 at Xizhimen and Dongzhimen. Line 13's color is yellow. During rush hour, the section between Xizhimen and Wudaokou Stations was reported in 2013 to be the second most congested section in the Beijing subway network, operating at 130% capacity.

Fare

Starting fare of RMB(¥) 3.00 that increases according to the distance fare scheme introduced in December 2014.

Regular subway users can use a Yikatong card, which offers even cheaper journeys, as well as mobile phone apps, which deploy payment via a QR code.

Hours of operation

The last trains to go the full-distance and reach the other terminus depart from Xizhimen and Dongzhimen at 10:42pm. In addition, Line 13 offers later night trains from either terminus that travel half of the full route. The last train to leave Xizhimen, departs at 11:45pm and ends its journey at Huilongguan at 12:09am. The last train to leave Dongzhimen, departs at 11:45pm and ends its journey at Huoying at 12:09am. For the official timetable, see. The frequency of trains on Line 13 vary from 3.5 minutes per train during the morning rush hour (6:20am – 9:40am) to 5 minutes per train during the evening rush hour (4:40pm – 8:40pm) to 10-11.5 minutes per train after 10:50pm. For full listing of train frequency, see.

Route
Line 13's route is shaped like a horseshoe over northern Beijing. From  in Xicheng District, Line 13 heads north, running alongside the Beijing-Baotou Railway into Haidian. After three stops in the bustling university district -- ,  (transfer to Line 10) and —Line 13 leaves the 5th Ring Road and enters the suburbs of northern Haidian. At , Line 13 meets the Changping Line, and turns east, following the southern edge of Changping District for three stops (and ), before turning to the southeast. At , Line 13 intersects with Line 15.

Stations (from West to East)

History

Line 13 was opened in two sections: The western section between Xizhimen and Huoying was opened on September 28, 2002; the eastern section from Huoying to Dongzhimen was opened on January 28, 2003. Despite being numbered 13, the line was only the third subway line to enter into operation. It was the first Beijing Subway line to adopt Yikatong, the electronic farecard, at the end of 2003.

Future Development
On November 22, 2018, the Beijing Municipal Commission of Planning and Natural Resources began the 30-day public consultation of a plan to split Line 13 into two lines, temporarily named Line 13A and Line 13B. According to the plan, the existing Line 13 will be split between Xi'erqi station and Huilongguan station, to form two "L"-shaped lines intersecting in the north of the city. Passengers can use cross-platform interchange between Line 13A and Line 13B at a new station in the west of the Jingzang Expressway.

Line 13A

The line will be built to support expanded 8-car Type B trains.

Line 13B

The line will continue to use 6-car Type B trains.

Rolling stock

Current

Former

Notes

References

Beijing Subway lines
Beijing Subway, Line 13
2002 establishments in China
750 V DC railway electrification